The Shippingport Bridge is a cantilevered through truss bridge carrying Pennsylvania Route 168 across the Ohio River between Shippingport, Pennsylvania and Industry, Pennsylvania. It was constructed in 1961. From 1951 until the opening of this bridge in 1964, PA 168 was accessed across the river via Cooks Ferry.

The southern approach to the bridge is adjacent to the Beaver Valley Nuclear Generating Station.

On May 14, 1969, the Chester Bridge (1896–1970) between East Liverpool, Ohio and Chester, West Virginia, which had carried U.S. 30 across the Ohio River, was permanently closed. From that day until November 7, 1977, when the Jennings Randolph Bridge was opened to traffic, the Shippingport Bridge carried what was temporarily designated as "Detour U.S. 30". That detour used Ohio S.R. 39 through the East End of East Liverpool to reach Pennsylvania S.R. 68. It remained on that route through Midland, PA, then used Pennsylvania S.R. 168 on the Shippingport Bridge to cross the river.

See also

 List of crossings of the Ohio River

References

Bridges over the Ohio River
Bridges in Beaver County, Pennsylvania
Road bridges in Pennsylvania
Cantilever bridges in the United States
Truss bridges in the United States
1964 establishments in Pennsylvania
Bridges completed in 1964